Keith J. Devlin (born 16 March 1947) is a British mathematician and popular science writer. Since 1987 he has lived in the United States. He has dual British-American citizenship.

Biography 
He was born and grew up in England, in Kingston upon Hull. There he attended a local primary school followed by Greatfield High School in Hull. In the last school year he was appointed head boy.
Devlin earned a BSc (special) in mathematics at King's College London in 1968, and a PhD in mathematics at the University of Bristol in 1971 under the supervision of Frederick Rowbottom.

Career
Later he got a position as a scientific assistant in mathematics at the University of Oslo, Norway, from August till December 1972. In 1974 he became a scientific assistant in mathematics at the University of Heidelberg, Germany. In 1976 he was an assistant professor of mathematics at the University of Toronto, Canada.
From 1977 till 1987 he served as a lecturer, then reader, in mathematics at the University of Lancaster, England. From 1987 to 1989 he was a visiting professor of mathematics at Stanford University in California. From 1989 to 1993 he was the Carter Professor of Mathematics and Chair of Department at Colby College in Maine. From 1993 to 2000 he was Dean of Science and a professor of mathematics at St. Mary's College of California. From 2001 until he retired he was a senior researcher at Stanford University.

He is co-founder and executive director of Stanford University's Human-Sciences and Technologies Advanced Research Institute (2006), a co-founder of Stanford Media X university-industry research partnership program, and a senior researcher in the Center for the Study of Language and Information (CSLI). He is a commentator on National Public Radio's Weekend Edition Saturday, where he is known as "The Math Guy."

His current research is mainly focused on the use of different media to teach mathematics to different audiences. He is also co-founder and president of the company BrainQuake, which creates mathematics learning video games, which he set up in 2011. Other topics of his research are the theory of information, models of reasoning, applications of mathematical techniques in the study of communication, and mathematical cognition.

As of 2012 he had authored 34 books and over 80 research articles. Several of his books are aimed at a general audience.

Awards
 Joint Policy Board for Mathematics Communications Award, 2001
 In 2007 he received Wonderfest's Carl Sagan Prize for Science Popularization.
 2004 International Pythagoras Prize in Mathematics, in the category Best Expository Text in the Mathematical Sciences for the Italian translation of The Millennium Problems
 Fellow of the American Mathematical Society, 2012

Bibliography
Articles
 [First proof of Jensen's covering theorem; Keith J. Devlin is credited as Keith I. Devlin in the paper.]

Books

 with coauthor Gary Lorden

References

External links
  including his curriculum vitae
 Devlin's Angle — column at the Mathematical Association of America

1947 births
Living people
Alumni of King's College London
Alumni of the University of Bristol
Set theorists
Stanford University staff
20th-century British mathematicians
21st-century British mathematicians
Mathematicians from Kingston upon Hull
Fellows of the American Mathematical Society
Mathematics popularizers